Lambert-François-Thérèse  Cammas (1743–1804) was a French painter, architect, and engineer,

Life
Cammas was born at Toulouse in 1743. He was instructed in the rudiments of art by his
father, Guillaume Cammas, an architect who designed the façade of the Hôtel-de-Ville at Toulouse. He later went to Rome, where, in 1770, he became professor at the Academy of St. Luke. On his return to France he protested against the bad taste which had disfigured the majestic outlines of the noblest churches with mean and ridiculous ornaments, and made numerous designs for the restoration of almost all the religious edifices of the city of Toulouse.

Cammas died in Toulouse in 1804. His picture representing Louis XVI recalling the Parliaments exiled during the reign of Louis XV is in the Museum of his native city.

References

Sources
 

18th-century French painters
French male painters
19th-century French painters
Artists from Toulouse
1743 births
1804 deaths
18th-century French architects
Painters from Rome
19th-century French male artists
Architects from Toulouse
Engineers from Toulouse
18th-century French male artists